Tinagma obscurofasciella is a moth in the  family Douglasiidae. It is found in North America, where it has been recorded from Kentucky, Maine, Michigan and Minnesota.

Adults have been recorded on wing in April and June.

The larvae feed on various rosaceous plants, including Geum and Potentilla species. They mine the leaves of their host plant.

References

Moths described in 1881
Douglasiidae